Eugnosta ussuriana is a species of moth of the  family Tortricidae. It is found in the Russian Far East (Amur) and Japan (Hokkaido and Honshu). It has also been recorded from China.

The wingspan is about 20 mm.

References

Moths described in 1926
Eugnosta